Herman C. Raymaker (22 January 1893 – 6 March 1944) was an American film director and actor. He directed 51 films between 1917 and 1934. His last two films as director were Trailing the Killer (1932) and Adventure Girl (1934).

He was born in Oakland, California, USA and died in Oceanside, Long Island, New York.

Partial filmography
 Racing Luck (1924)
Below the Line (1925)
The Love Hour (1925)
Tracked in the Snow Country (1925) 
His Jazz Bride (1926)
The Night Cry (1926)
 Flying Luck (1927)
The Gay Old Bird (1927)
Under the Tonto Rim (1928)

External links

1893 births
1944 deaths
American film directors
Male actors from Oakland, California
People from Oceanside, New York